Grand Park Hotel is a hotel located in downtown Mandalay, Myanmar. The 31-story tower is the tallest building in the country outside of Yangon. The hotel was partially opened, with 302 rooms available in September 2019, and with another 92 rooms to be ready by December 2019.

Notes

References

Bibliography
 

Buildings and structures in Mandalay
Hotels in Myanmar
Hotel buildings completed in 2019
2019 establishments in Myanmar